Angerton is a former civil parish (now in Duddon civil parish) in the South Lakeland district of Cumbria, England, historically part of the Furness portion of Lancashire. The parish includes a few houses, Angerton Hall, and Angerton Marsh. The 2001 census recorded a population of 14. Owing to the minimal population, details from the 2011 Census were recorded in the parish of Kirkby Ireleth.

References

External links
  Cumbria County History Trust: Angerton (nb: provisional research only - see Talk page)

Former civil parishes in Cumbria
South Lakeland District